Edward Nathan George Jr. (born September 24, 1973) is an American football coach and former player who is the current head coach at Tennessee State. He played as a running back in the National Football League (NFL) for nine seasons, primarily for the Houston / Tennessee Oilers / Titans franchise.

He played college football at Ohio State and won the Heisman Trophy in 1995. He was drafted in the first round of the 1996 NFL Draft, and played professionally for the Tennessee Titans (both in Tennessee and in Houston when the franchise was known as the Houston Oilers) and Dallas Cowboys. George was inducted into the College Football Hall of Fame in 2011.

Post-football, George earned an MBA from Northwestern University's Kellogg School of Management. In 2015, he guest starred on an IFC episode of the satirical talk-show Comedy Bang! Bang!, titled "Eddie George Wears a Navy Suit and Half-Zip Pullover." In 2016, he appeared on Broadway in the musical Chicago as the hustling lawyer Billy Flynn.

Early life
George was born in Philadelphia. He played Pop Warner football for the Abington Raiders. He attended Abington Senior High School until the tenth grade, and then transferred to Fork Union Military Academy. George made the decision to stay at Fork Union Military Academy for a fifth prep school year or postgraduate year. Such choices are commonly made by high school football players hoping to improve their recruitment status with colleges, but for George, it meant another year of the rigorous military lifestyle. George rushed for 1,372 yards in his postgraduate season at FUMA, attracting the attention of several major colleges.

College career
George attended Ohio State University, where he majored in landscape architecture and played for the Ohio State Buckeyes football team. As a freshman running back, George scored three rushing touchdowns in a win over Syracuse. However, he suffered a major setback in a game against Illinois. In that game, George lost a fumble at the Illinois 4-yard line that was returned 96 yards for a touchdown. Later in the game, with Ohio State leading by 2 points in the final quarter, George fumbled again, this time on Illinois' 1-yard line. Illinois recovered the fumble and drove for the game-winning touchdown.

Before the Illinois game, George had carried the ball 25 times and scored 5 touchdowns, but he had only 12 more rushing attempts and no more touchdowns for the rest of the year. In the following season, George was listed in the depth chart as the team's third-string running back, behind Raymont Harris. He carried the ball just 42 times, mostly when Ohio State had a large lead late in games, but showed his potential by averaging 5.3 yards per carry. As a junior, George became the team's starting running back and went on to rush for 1,442 yards and 12 touchdowns.

As a senior in the 1995 season, George rushed for a school-record 1,927 yards and 24 touchdowns, an average of 148.23 yards per game, while also catching 47 passes for 417 yards and another score (George only caught 16 passes in his first three seasons). One of his best performances of the year was in a 45–26 win over Notre Dame, where he rushed for 207 yards, his third 200-yard game of the season. He also rushed for a school-record 314 yards and scored 3 touchdowns in OSU's victory over Illinois.

In the 3 years after his 2 fumbles as a freshman, George had over 600 rushing attempts and fumbled only 6 times. Ohio State finished the season with an 11-2 record. George was recognized as a consensus first-team All-American. He won the Heisman Trophy in the closest vote in the history of the award at the time, beating Nebraska's Tommie Frazier by 264 votes. George left Ohio State second in school history in career rushing yards (3,768) and third in rushing touchdowns (44). Overall, he finished with 4,284 all-purpose yards, 45 touchdowns, and a 5.5 yards per carry average.

College statistics

Professional career

George was the first-round draft selection (14th overall pick) of the Houston Oilers (now the Tennessee Titans) in the 1996 NFL Draft, being selected after Jerome Bettis elected to be traded to the rival Pittsburgh Steelers over the Oilers when the St. Louis Rams replaced Bettis with Lawrence Phillips. George won the NFL Rookie of the Year award in 1996, and was the Oilers/Titans' starting tailback through 2003, never missing a start. He made the Pro Bowl four consecutive years (1997–2000), and assisted the Titans to a championship appearance in Super Bowl XXXIV, where they lost to the St. Louis Rams 23–16. George gained 391 combined rushing and receiving yards in the Titans' three playoff games that year and went on to rush for 95 yards, catching two passes for 35 yards, and score two touchdowns in the Super Bowl.

George is only the second NFL running back to rush for 10,000 yards while never missing a start, joining Jim Brown. Only Walter Payton (170) started more consecutive regular-season games than George's 130.

Though George rushed for 1,000 yards in all but one season, numerous sportswriters suggested that a heavy workload caused a decline in George's productivity. In five of his eight seasons with the Titans, George carried the ball over 330 times. In 2001, George averaged just 2.98 per carry, the fourth lowest number in league history among running backs with more than 200 rushing attempts in a season. George's decline in production along with several toe and ankle injuries were contributing factors in Titans owner Bud Adams' decision to release him on July 21, 2004, in part due to salary cap considerations, after George would not agree to a pay cut.

On July 23, 2004, George signed a one-year contract with the Dallas Cowboys for $1.5 million-plus incentives that could have earned him more than the $4.25 million he would have made under his previous contract with the Titans. George only started 8 games for Dallas while rookie Julius Jones was out for two months with a fractured scapula. He became the backup running back when Jones returned midway through the season, finishing with 432 yards on 132 carries and 4 touchdowns. He officially retired in 2006.

His career totals include 10,441 rushing yards, 268 receptions, 2,227 receiving yards, and 78 touchdowns (68 rushing and 10 receiving).

In 2021, he became a semifinalist (of the 26-person Modern-Era list) for the Pro Football Hall of Fame, the first time he had made the stage since he was eligible.

NFL career statistics

Regular season

Postseason

Franchise records
's NFL off-season, Eddie George still held at least 28 Titans franchise records, including:
 Most Rush Attempts (career): 2,733
 Most Rush Attempts (season): 403 (2000)
 Most Rush Attempts (playoff career): 206
 Most Rush Attempts (playoff season): 108 (1999)
 Most Rush Attempts (playoff game): 29 (2000-01-08 BUF)
 Most Rush Attempts (rookie season): 335 (1996)
 Most Rush Attempts (game, as a rookie): 28 (1996-12-01 @NYJ; tied with Earl Campbell)
 Most Rush Yards (career): 10,009
 Most Rush Yards (playoff career): 776
 Most Rush Yards (playoff season): 449 (1999)
 Most Rushing TDs (playoff season): 3 (1999; tied with Steve McNair)
 Most Rushing TDs (playoff game): 2 (2000-01-30 NSTL)
 Most Rush Yds/Game (playoff career): 86.2
 Most Rush Yds/Game (playoff season): 112.2 (1999)
 Most Total TDs (career): 74
 Most Total TDs (playoff season): 3 (1999; tied with Steve McNair x2)
 Most Yds from Scrimmage (career): 12,153
 Most Yds from Scrimmage (playoff career): 925
 Most Yds from Scrimmage (playoff season): 521 (1999)
 Most Yds from Scrimmage (rookie season): 1,550 (1996)
 Most All Purpose Yds (career): 12,154
 Most All Purpose Yds (playoff season): 521 (1999)
 Most 100+ yard rushing games (playoffs): 2
 Most Games with 1+ TD scored (career): 59
 Most Games with 2+ TD scored (career): 17 (Tied with Earl Campbell)
 Most Games with 3+ TD scored (season): 3 (2000)
 Most 1000+ rushing yard seasons: 7

Coaching career
George was named the head coach at Tennessee State on April 13, 2021. He signed a five-year deal that paid $400,000 annually.

Head coaching record

Personal life

On October 1, 2006, George was appointed spokesperson for Tennessee's GetFitTN program by Governor Phil Bredesen. The initiative is aimed at preventing Type 2 diabetes and promotion of healthier, more active lifestyles. On Saturday, April 28, 2007, George ran the Country Music Half Marathon (ending just outside then LP Field, now Nissan Stadium) in an unofficial time of 2:04:08. He wore race number 27 during the race, just as he wore number 27 during his college and NFL careers. George later stated that completing the race was tougher than playing in the NFL.

In 2008, George campaigned for Senator Barack Obama's presidential bid.

After he retired from football, George went back to complete his bachelor's degree in landscape architecture from Ohio State. He later graduated from the Kellogg School of Management at Northwestern University, earning his MBA degree from the Executive MBA program.

In 2004, George married American singer, rapper, actress, and author Tamara "Taj" Johnson. She is best known for being a part of the group SWV (Sisters with Voices) and later being a contestant on the 18th season of the CBS reality show Survivor. On the 12th episode, "The Ultimate Sacrifice", George surprised his wife, by visiting her on Exile Island. His other thespian credits include performances on Broadway and in film.

George's jersey was retired by the Titans during a halftime ceremony against the Indianapolis Colts on September 15, 2019, along with former teammate Steve McNair who was killed in 2009.

George also owns a restaurant in Columbus called Eddie George Bar and Grille 27.

See also
 List of NCAA major college football yearly scoring leaders

References

Further reading
.

External links

 
 
 
 
 

1973 births
Living people
African-American businesspeople
African-American coaches of American football
African-American male actors
African-American players of American football
All-American college football players
American Conference Pro Bowl players
American football running backs
American restaurateurs
Big Ten Athlete of the Year winners
Businesspeople from Philadelphia
Coaches of American football from Pennsylvania
College football announcers
College Football Hall of Fame inductees
Dallas Cowboys players
Ed Block Courage Award recipients
Heisman Trophy winners
Houston Oilers players
Kellogg School of Management alumni
Male actors from Philadelphia
Maxwell Award winners
National Football League announcers
National Football League Offensive Rookie of the Year Award winners
National Football League players with retired numbers
Ohio State Buckeyes football players
People from Abington Township, Montgomery County, Pennsylvania
Players of American football from Philadelphia
Players of American football from Tennessee
Sportspeople from Philadelphia
Tennessee Oilers players
Tennessee State Tigers football coaches
Tennessee Titans players